Tyler John Lorenzen (Born December 24, 1985) is a former American football tight end. He was signed by the Jacksonville Jaguars as an undrafted free agent in 2009. He also played for the New Orleans Saints. He played college football for the University of Connecticut. He is currently the CEO of Puris Proteins, a pea protein producer based in Minneapolis.

Early years
Lorenzen attended Eddyville-Blakesburg High School, where he led the football team to two state playoff appearances.

Junior college career
Previous to playing at the University of Connecticut, Lorenzen played a season at Palomar College in San Marcos, California. Following his season at Palomar, he was rated the No. 2 junior college quarterback prospect in the nation for the class of 2007 by JCGridiron.com.

College career
Lorenzen played college football at Connecticut, where he was a quarterback and started 21 games in two seasons for the Huskies.

Professional career

Although he played quarterback in college, Lorenzen converted to tight end as a pro.  After first signing with Jacksonville in April 2009, he moved to the Saints practice squad in September and was with the team for its Super Bowl winning 2009 season.  Cut by the Saints in September 2010, he spent several months working in his family's soybean genetics business before the Saints re-signed him in December.

References

External links
New Orleans Saints bio 
Jacksonville Jaguars bio 
UConn Huskies bio 

1985 births
Living people
People from Mahaska County, Iowa
People from Eddyville, Iowa
American football tight ends
New Orleans Saints players
Jacksonville Jaguars players
UConn Huskies football players
American football quarterbacks
Palomar Comets football players